Same-sex marriage in the Netherlands has been legal since 1 April 2001. A bill for the legalisation of same-sex marriage was passed in the House of Representatives by 109 votes to 33 on 12 September 2000 and by the Senate by 49 votes to 26 on 19 December 2000. The law received royal assent by Queen Beatrix of the Netherlands on 21 December 2000 and took effect on 1 April 2001. The Netherlands was the first country in the world to legalize same-sex marriage.

Same-sex marriage has been legal in Bonaire, Sint Eustatius and Saba, special municipalities of the Netherlands, since 10 October 2012. The three other constituent countries of the Kingdom of the Netherlands, Aruba, Curaçao and Sint Maarten, do not perform same-sex marriages.

Unregistered partnerships
Unregistered partnerships or informal cohabitation occur when a same-sex or opposite-sex couple cohabits but chooses to keep the legal status of their relationship unregistered or informal. This means all worldwide assets that belong to a single party remain the sole property of the party with no legal entitlement by the other party, whether owned before or acquired during the relationship. The couple can record a contract (samenlevingscontract) with a notary to receive some limited financial benefits, including for tax and pension purposes. However, the benefits are limited, e.g. the father or non-biological mother is not automatically recognized as a parent after the birth of a child, and upon the death of one of the partners, the other partner is not considered an heir. This legal status of unregistered partnerships is respected by Dutch courts.

The Netherlands was one of the first countries in the world to recognise cohabiting same-sex couples by law. The first law recognising the cohabitation of same-sex couples was passed in 1979 for the purposes of rent law. Further legislation was passed in 1981 to recognise cohabiting couples for the purposes of inheritance tax.

Registered partnerships
On 1 January 1998, registered partnerships were introduced in Dutch law. The partnerships were meant for same-sex couples as an alternative to marriage, though they can also be entered into by opposite-sex couples, and in fact about one third of the registered partnerships between 1999 and 2001 were of opposite-sex couples. In law, registered partnerships and marriage convey the same rights and duties, especially after some laws were changed to remedy inequalities with respect to inheritance and some other issues.

Partnerships have become particularly common among Dutch couples, with about 18,000 new partnerships registered every year.

Same-sex marriage

Legislative action
As early as the mid-1980s, a group of gay rights activists, headed by Henk Krol – then editor-in-chief of the Gay Krant – asked the government to allow same-sex couples to marry. The States General of the Netherlands decided in 1995 to create a special commission to investigate the possibility of recognizing same-sex marriages. At that time, the Christian Democratic Appeal was not part of the ruling coalition for the first time since the introduction of full democracy. The special commission finished its work in 1997 and concluded that civil marriage should be extended to include same-sex couples. After the 1998 general election, the Second Kok Cabinet promised to tackle the issue. In September 2000, the legislation was debated in the Dutch Parliament.

The marriage bill passed the House of Representatives by 109 votes to 33 on 12 September 2000.

a. Was originally a member of the Reformatory Political Federation (RPF).
b. Was originally a member of the Reformed Political League (GPV).

The Senate approved the bill on 19 December 2000 by 49 to 26 votes. Only the Christian parties, which held 26 of the 75 seats at the time, voted against the bill. Although the Christian Democratic Appeal would form the next government, they did not indicate any intention to repeal the law.

a. Was originally a member of the Reformed Political League (GPV).
b. Was originally a member of the Reformatory Political Federation (RPF).

Queen Beatrix of the Netherlands gave her royal assent to the legislation on 21 December 2000. The main article of the law changed article 1:30 of the Civil Code to read as follows:

(A marriage can be entered into by two persons of opposing or the same sex)

The law came into effect on 1 April 2001, and on that day four same-sex couples were married by the Mayor of Amsterdam, Job Cohen, who became a registrar specifically to officiate at the weddings. A few months earlier, Mayor Cohen had been junior Minister of Justice of the Netherlands and was responsible for putting the new marriage and adoption laws through Parliament.

Requirements and rights

Dutch law requires that either partner have Dutch nationality or have residency in the Netherlands. The marriageable age in the Netherlands is 18. The law is only valid in the European territory of the Netherlands and on the Caribbean islands of Bonaire, Sint Eustatius and Saba, but does not apply to the other constituent countries of the Kingdom of the Netherlands.

The single legal difference between same-sex marriages and heterosexual marriages was that, in the former case, parentage by both partners was not automatic. The legal mother of a child is its biological mother (article 1:198 of the civil law) and the father is (in principle) the man she is married to or in a registered partnership with when the child is born. Moreover, the father must be a man (article 1:199). The other partner could thus become a legal mother only through adoption. Only in the case when a biological father did not become a parent (e.g. in case of artificial insemination by lesbian couples) would both female spouses obtain parental authority automatically (article 1:253sa). In December 2013, the Dutch Parliament changed this and allowed automatic parenthood for lesbian couples. The new law, which came into effect on 1 April 2014, allows the co-mother who is married to or in a registered partnership with the biological mother to be automatically recognized as a legal mother if the sperm donor was initially anonymous. In the case of a known donor, the biological mother decides whether the donor or the co-mother is the child's second legal parent.

On 6 April 2016, Minister of Foreign Affairs Bert Koenders and Minister of Security and Justice Ard van der Steur confirmed the Dutch position that, like other couples, same-sex couples who are not Dutch residents or nationals cannot marry in the country. The ministers argued that it might lead to "practical and legal problems" and could even be "dangerous" to some participants. The move came after the Liberal Democratic Party had asked the ministers to look into allowing non-resident foreigners to take advantage of the Netherlands' same-sex marriage law.

Religious performance
Since the mid-1960s, religious solemnizations of same-sex relationships have taken place in some Dutch churches. The Dutch Remonstrants were Europe's first Christian denomination to officially allow such solemnizations in 1986. The Mennonite Church in the Netherlands also allows solemnizations of same-sex marriages. The Old Catholic Church of the Netherlands has allowed its ministers to perform same-sex marriages in its places of worship since 2006.

The Protestant Church in the Netherlands, the largest Protestant denomination in the Netherlands, has allowed its congregations to perform same-sex marriages as a union of love and faith before God since 2004, and in practice many churches now conduct such ceremonies.

Aruba, Curaçao and Sint Maarten

In Aruba, Curaçao, and Sint Maarten, separate civil codes exist in which rules for marriage are laid down and it is not possible to perform a same-sex marriage in these constituent countries.

All territories of the Kingdom of the Netherlands register same-sex marriages performed in the Netherlands proper as a result of a Dutch Supreme Court ruling. In 2007, the Supreme Court ruled that all vital records recorded in the Kingdom of the Netherlands are valid throughout the Kingdom; this was based on its interpretation of the Charter for the Kingdom of the Netherlands. However, subsequent rulings have established that same-sex marriages are not automatically entitled to the same privileges (e.g. social security) extended to married couples of the opposite sex.

Aruba has recognised registered partnerships, offering several of the rights and benefits of marriage, for same-sex and opposite-sex couples since September 2021.

Bonaire, Sint Eustatius and Saba

Same-sex marriage became legal in the Caribbean Netherlands—Bonaire, Sint Eustatius and Saba—following the entry into force of a law enabling same-sex couples to marry on 10 October 2012.

Opposition
In 2007, controversy arose when the new Fourth Balkenende Cabinet announced in its policy statement that officials who object to same-sex marriage on principle may refuse to marry such couples. Some Labour and GroenLinks dominated municipal councils opposed this policy, claiming that the job of a registrar is to marry all couples, not only opposite-sex couples. The opposition parties stated that if a registrar opposed same-sex marriages, they should not hold that post. The municipality of Amsterdam announced that they would not comply with this policy, and that registrars there would still be obliged to marry same-sex couples. In reaction to this, many other municipalities announced their rejection of this proposal as well. The cabinet claimed that this issue lay solely within the remit of the central government. In practice, municipalities could decide whether or not to hire registrars who object to marrying same-sex couples.

Before 2014, civil servants could refuse to marry same-sex couples as long as the municipality ensured that other civil servants were available to solemnize the marriage. In 2014, a law was passed that made it illegal for all marriage officiants to refuse their services to same-sex couples.

Royal same-sex weddings
In October 2021, Prime Minister Mark Rutte confirmed that members of the Dutch royal family may enter into a same-sex marriage without having to forfeit the crown or lose their royal title and privileges or their place in the line of succession. Previously, the government held that if an heir wanted to marry a partner of the same sex, they would have to forfeit their right to the throne.

Impact
A 2021 study by economists Shuai Chen and Jan van Ours showed that from 2001 onwards levels of anxiety and depression fell drastically among individuals in same-sex relationships and largely converged to those of heterosexuals. Chen and van Ours found that the legalisation of same-sex marriage, as well as supportive societal attitudes, significantly improved the mental health of LGBT people. They concluded, "We find a significant improvement in the mental health of sexual minorities following the legislation. We also find that marriage itself was only partially responsible for the amelioration of mental health among sexual minorities. More importantly, the legal recognition of same-sex marriage improved mental health for both male and female sexual minorities irrespective of their own marital status."

Statistics

According to provisional figures from Statistics Netherlands, for the first six months, same-sex marriages made up 3.6% of the total number of marriages: a peak of around 6% in the first month followed by around 3% in the remaining months, about 1,339 male couples and 1,075 female couples in total. By June 2004, more than 6,000 same-sex marriages had been performed in the Netherlands.

In March 2006, Statistics Netherlands released estimates on the number of same-sex marriages performed each year: 2,500 in 2001, 1,800 in 2002, 1,200 in 2004, and 1,100 in 2005.

From 2001 to 2011, 14,813 same-sex marriages were performed in the Netherlands; 7,522 between two women and 7,291 between two men. In the same period, there were 761,010 heterosexual marriages. There were also 1,078 same-sex divorces. By 2015, approximately 21,330 same-sex couples had married in the Netherlands; 11,195 lesbian couples and 10,135 male couples.

On 1 April 2021, 20 years after same-sex marriage was legalized in the Netherlands, Statistics Netherlands reported that over 28,000 same-sex couples had married in the country by that time. Roughly 20,000 of these couples were still together; the remaining having divorced, moved abroad or one or both of the spouses died. Lesbian couples were more likely to divorce, at around 26%, than heterosexual couples at 16%, and male couples at 14%.

Public opinion
According to an Ifop poll conducted in May 2013, 85% of the Dutch population supported allowing same-sex couples to marry and adopt children.

The 2015 Eurobarometer found that 91% of the Dutch population thought same-sex marriage should be allowed throughout Europe, while 7% were opposed.

A Pew Research Center poll, conducted between April and August 2017 and published in May 2018, showed that 86% of Dutch people supported same-sex marriage, 10% were opposed and 4% did not know or refused to answer. When divided by religion, 95% of religiously unaffiliated people, 90% of non-practicing Christians and 60% of church-attending Christians supported same-sex marriage. Opposition was also 10% among 18–34-year-olds.

The 2019 Eurobarometer found that 92% of Dutch people thought same-sex marriage should be allowed throughout Europe, while 8% were opposed.

See also 
 LGBT rights in the Netherlands
 Same-sex marriage in Bonaire, Sint Eustatius and Saba
 Same-sex marriage in Aruba, Curaçao and Sint Maarten
 Samenlevingscontract
 Same-sex marriage in Belgium
 Recognition of same-sex unions in Europe

Notes

References

 
Society of the Netherlands
2001 in LGBT history
2001 in the Netherlands
April 2001 events in Europe